Siniša Gogić (born 20 October 1963) is a football manager and former professional player who played as a striker. He is an assistant coach with Russian club FC Krasnodar.

At club level he played for Yugoslav clubs Radnički Niš and FK Rad, for the Greece football team Olympiacos (1997–2000), the Cypriot teams APOEL, Anorthosis Famagusta and Olympiakos Nicosia and Cyprus national football team. Born in Yugoslavia, he represented Cyprus at international level. After finishing his playing career, he became a manager.

Career 
Born in Niš, SR Serbia, SFR Yugoslavia, Gogić began his career there, and played for the Yugoslav First League clubs FK Radnički Niš and FK Rad. Gogic first went to Cyprus in 1989 and played for APOEL where he won the championship in his first season. The same year Gogic became top goalscorer of the Cypriot First Division with 19 goals. He stayed at APOEL for a few years where he won the championship again in 1991–92 and the Cypriot Cup in 1992–1993. In 1993, after an argument with the APOEL coach, he left APOEL for Anorthosis and became again top goal scorer, this time with 26 goals and the following season, he helped Anorthosis win the Championship (1994/95) for the first time in 32 years and scoring 24 goals (2nd top scorer). He had a great season in 1996/97 ( 14 goals in 13 games) which attracted the interest of Olympiacos Piraeus. He joined Olympiacos at the age of 33, in 1997 from Cypriot side Anorthosis Famagusta and nobody could imagine his excellent attacking abilities.

He stayed at Olympiacos for 4 years, during which Olympiacos dominated the domestic league. Those four years Olympiacos became champions in Greece (1997–2000). 1998/99, was the greatest season for Olympiacos as the club won the Double and for first time reached the quarter finals of the UEFA Champions League. Gogic was considered one of the best Olympiacos players in the club's greatest achievement, in both Greek and European competitions. His nickname among the fans was "Pappous", which means "grandpa", because it was not until late in his career that he met with club success on a greater level.

In the first match against FC Porto, when Olympiacos was losing 2–0 away, he played for the last five minutes and he equalized by scoring Olympiacos' second goal. He scored several other goals in the Group stage and Olympiacos then faced Juventus in the quarter finals. After a 2–1 away defeat in Stadio delle Alpi, the result was giving enough chances for Olympiacos to qualify. Gogic played during the whole match in the second leg, in Olympic Stadium (Athens) and during the first 15 minutes he scored a goal for Olympiacos. The result, which would have given Olympiacos a place in the semi-finals for first time, remained unchanged until the 85th minute, when Antonio Conte equalized for Juventus and Olympiacos was eliminated.

One year later, Gogic left Olympiacos and returned to Cyprus, where he joined his favourite team APOEL again. In 2001–02 he helped his team once more to win the championship by scoring 16 goals in 26 appearances.

In 2002–2003, following financial differences with APOEL, he played for six months for Olympiakos Nicosia, where he ended his career.

Coaching career
At the age of 42 he became manager in Olympiacos' youth academies and after that at the age of 44 he was the manager of Cypriot team Apollon Limassol FC. On 14 September 2008 he was named as assistant coach at Red Star Belgrade, then on 9 May 2009 became the head coach at Red Star Belgrade, replacing Čedomir Janevski. On 12 June 2009, Gogić agreed with Panetolikos F.C. chairman Fotis Kostoulas to take over as manager of Panetolikos, replacing Vasilis Dalaperas. On 18 February 2010, he signed for Shenzhen Ruby. He managed the youth team of Olympiacos during the 2011–12 season.

In June 2012, Gogić was hired by newly relegated to the Football League side Ergotelis, who had set their sights at instant re-promotion to the Superleague. He led the club for  months, boasting an impressive 12−5−3 record at the end of the competition first round. However, Ergotelis' performance dropped significantly during the second round, as the team struggled at home and away to secure more points for promotion, and dropped below 3rd place on the league table. After managing a sub-par 3−5−3 record during the second round of the competition, the club's board of directors decided to terminate  Gogić's contract on 16 April 2013.

In May 2013, Gogić was hired by Iraklis.

In January 2023, he was hired as an assistant to Vladimir Ivić by the Russian club FC Krasnodar.

Personal life
His son Alex Gogić is also a footballer and a Cyprus international.

Honours

Club
APOEL
 Cypriot First Division: 1989-1990, 1991-1992, 2001-2002
 Cypriot Super Cup: 2002

Anorthosis
 Cypriot First Division: 1994-1995, 1996-1997
 Cypriot Super Cup: 1995
 Cypriot Cup runner-up: 1993-1994

Olympiacos
Greek Championship: 1997-1998, 1998-1999, 1999-2000
Greek Super Cup: 1998-1999

Individual
Cypriot First Division top goalscorer: 1990, 1994

References

External links

1963 births
Living people
Sportspeople from Niš
Cypriot footballers
Cyprus international footballers
Yugoslav footballers
Serbian footballers
Serbian expatriate footballers
Serbian emigrants to Cyprus
Cypriot people of Serbian descent
Naturalized citizens of Cyprus
Yugoslav First League players
FK Radnički Niš players
FK Rad players
Anorthosis Famagusta F.C. players
APOEL FC players
Association football forwards
Olympiacos F.C. players
Olympiakos Nicosia players
Super League Greece players
Cypriot First Division players
Red Star Belgrade non-playing staff
Red Star Belgrade managers
Ethnikos Asteras F.C. managers
Panetolikos F.C. managers
Ergotelis F.C. managers
Expatriate footballers in Greece
Expatriate football managers in China
Cypriot expatriate sportspeople in China
FK Napredak Kruševac managers
Shenzhen F.C. managers
Cypriot football managers
Cypriot expatriate football managers
Expatriate football managers in Russia
Cypriot expatriate sportspeople in Russia